Alm Juq (also Romanized as Ālm Jūq; also known as Ālmeh Jūq, Almeh Jūq, and Kam Jūq) is a village in Sang Bast Rural District, in the Central District of Fariman County, Razavi Khorasan Province, Iran. At the 2006 census, its population was 28, in 6 families.

See also 

 List of cities, towns and villages in Razavi Khorasan Province

References 

Populated places in Fariman County